Tetrahydrofurfuryl alcohol (THFA) is an organic compound with the formula HOCH2C4H7O.  In terms of its structure, it consists of a tetrahydrofuran ring substituted in the 2-position with a hydroxymethyl group.  It is a colorless liquid that is used as a specialty solvent and synthetic intermediate, e.g. to 3,4-dihydropyran.  It is prepared by hydrogenation of furfural.  It is a precursor to 1,5-pentanediol.

Other uses 
THFA is often used in epoxy resin formulations in either the epoxy component or amine hardener as well as other general resin applications.

External links
 Safety Data Sheet

References

Ether solvents
Tetrahydrofurans